Ole-Kristian Bryhn (born 1 May 1989) is a Norwegian sport shooter.

Career
He qualified for the 2012 Summer Olympics in London in the 50 m rifle 3 positions, finishing in 7th place.

At the 2016 Summer Olympics in Rio de Janeiro, he competed in 10 metre air rifle, 50 metre rifle prone, and 50 m rifle 3 positions events. In the 10 m air rifle competition, he finished in 40th place in the qualification round and did not qualify for the finals. In the 50 m rifle prone competition, he finished 43rd in the qualification round and did not qualify for the final. In the 50 m rifle 3 positions competition, he finished 3rd in the qualification round and advanced to the finals where he finished in 8th place. He was the flagbearer for Norway during the Parade of Nations.

References

External links

 

Norwegian male sport shooters
1989 births
Living people
Sportspeople from Drammen
Shooters at the 2012 Summer Olympics
Olympic shooters of Norway
European Games competitors for Norway
Shooters at the 2015 European Games
Shooters at the 2016 Summer Olympics
ISSF rifle shooters
21st-century Norwegian people